In Search of Manny is the debut extended play by American alternative rock band Luscious Jackson. The EP was released in 1992 on Grand Royal. It is essentially the band's demo tape, released after Mike D of Grand Royal heard a copy. It was the label's first release.

Recording
The majority of the album was recorded by Jill Cunniff and Gabrielle Glaser, with Vivian Trimble and Kate Schellenbach appearing on only two tracks.

Critical reception
MusicHound Rock: The Essential Album Guide wrote that the EP "blends girl group pop, hip-hop rhythms, and smooth urban attitude into a unique stew." The Spin Alternative Record Guide called the songs "sweet and sleazy, irradiated by Cunniff's honeyed vocals and Glaser's glacial sass."

Track listing
Let Yourself Get Down – 3:39
Life of Leisure – 5:11
Daughters of the Kaos – 3:47
Keep on Rockin' It – 3:39
She Be Wantin' It More – 2:52
Bam-Bam – 2:21
Satellite – 2:49

Personnel
Luscious Jackson
Kate Schellenbach – drums (tracks 6–7)
Vivian Trimble – keyboards (tracks 6–7)
Gabrielle Glaser – performer (tracks 1–5); guitar (tracks 6–7)
Jill Cunniff – performer (tracks 1–5); bass guitar (tracks 6–7)

Additional musicians
Danny Millings – extra voice (track 2)
Frankie Calalucci – extra voice (track 1)

Technical
Jill Cunniff – arranger
Gabrielle Glaser – arranger
Tony Mangurian – engineer (tracks 1–5)
Noah Evans – engineer (tracks 6–7)
Estelle Glaser – front photos
Rhana Harris – back photos
George Sewell – logo, graffiti
Simon Curtis – layout
Tom Baker – mastering

References

Luscious Jackson albums
1992 debut EPs
Grand Royal EPs